Pierre Joseph Auguste Messmer (20 March 191629 August 2007) was a French Gaullist politician. He served as Minister of Armies under Charles de Gaulle from 1960 to 1969 – the longest serving since Étienne François, duc de Choiseul under Louis XV – and then as Prime Minister under Georges Pompidou from 1972 to 1974. A member of the French Foreign Legion, he was considered one of the historical Gaullists, and died aged 91 in the military hospital of the Val-de-Grâce in August 2007. He was elected a member of the Académie française in 1999; his seat was taken over by Simone Veil.

Early career 

Pierre Joseph Auguste Messmer was born in Vincennes in 1916. He graduated in 1936 in the language school ENLOV and the following year at the Ecole nationale de la France d'outre-mer (National School of Oversea France). 

He then became a senior civil servant in the colonial administration and became a Doctor of Laws in 1939. In the outbreak of World War II, he was sous-lieutenant of the 12th regiment of Senegalese tirailleurs, and refused France's capitulation after the defeat. He then hijacked in Marseille an Italian cargo ship (the Capo Olmo), along with his friend  Jean Simon (a future French General), and sailed first to Gibraltar, then London and engaged himself in the Free French Forces as a member of the 13th Demi-Brigade of the French Foreign Legion. 

Messmer then participated to the campaign in Eritrea, in Syria, in Libya, participating to the Battle of Bir Hakeim, and in the Tunisia campaign. He also fought at the Battle of El Alamein in Egypt. He joined in London General Koenig's military staff and participated in the landings in Normandy in August 1944 and the Liberation of Paris.

Named Compagnon de la Libération in 1941, he received the Croix de guerre (War Cross) with six citations after the Liberation, as well as the medal of the Resistance.

After World War II 

After World War II, he returned to the colonies and was a prisoner of war of the Vietminh, during two months in 1945, after the outbreak of the First Indochina War. He was named the following year general secretary of the interministerial committee for Indochina and then head of staff of the high commissary of the Republic.

Colonial Administrator in Africa 
Messmer began his high-level African service as governor of Mauritania from 1952 to 1954, and then served as governor of Ivory Coast from 1954 to 1956, when he briefly returned to Paris in the staff of Gaston Defferre, Minister of Overseas Territories who enacted the Defferre Act granting to colonial territories internal autonomy, a first step towards independence.

That same year, Messmer was nominated as governor general of Cameroun, where a civil war had started the preceding year following the outlawing of the independentist Union of the Peoples of Cameroon (UPC) in July 1955. He initiated a decolonization process and imported the counter-revolutionary warfare methods theorized in Indochina and implemented during the Algerian War (1954–62).
Visiting de Gaulle in Paris, he was implicitly granted permission for his change of policies in Cameroon, which exchanged repression for negotiations with the UPC. 

A "Pacification Zone" – the ZOPAC (Zone de pacification du Cameroon) was created on 9 December 1957, englobing 7,000 square km controlled by seven infantry regiments. Furthermore, a civilian-military intelligence apparatus was created, combining colonial and local staff, assisted by a civilian militia. Mao Zedong's people's war was reversed, in an attempt to separate the civilian population from the guerrilla. In this aim, the local population was rounded-up in guarded villages located on the main roads, controlled by the French Army.

Messmer served as high commissioner of French Equatorial Africa from January 1958 to July 1958, and as high commissioner of French West Africa from 1958 to 1959.

Minister of Armies (1959–1969) 

From 1959 to 1969, under Charles de Gaulle's presidency and in the turmoil of the Algerian War, he was Minister of Armies. He was confronted with the 1961 Generals' Putsch, reorganized the Army and adapted it to the nuclear era.

In 1960, Messmer visited Lisbon and expressed lament for the United Nations resolutions against colonialism, approving of the Estado Novo regime's hardline stance against decolonisation on the grounds that Portugal represented the last vestige of white, Western civilisation on the African continent.

Messmer gave permission for former Algerian War veterans to fight in Katanga against the newly independent Congo and United Nations peacekeeping forces. He confided to Roger Trinquier that it was de Gaulle's ambition to replace the Belgians and control a reunited Congo from Élisabethville.

Along with the Minister of Research, Gaston Palewski, Messmer was present at the Béryl nuclear test in Algeria, on 1 May 1962, during which an accident occurred. Officials, soldiers and Algerian workers escaped as they could, often without wearing any protection. Palewski died in 1984 of leukemia, which he always has attributed to the Beryl incident, while Messmer always remained close-mouthed on the affair.

De Gaulle said of Messmer that, along with Maurice Couve de Murville, he was "one of his two arms. " In May '68, he advised de Gaulle against the use of the military.

Messmer became a personality of the Gaullist Party and was elected deputy in 1968, representing Moselle département. A member of the conservative wing of the Gaullist movement, he criticized the "New Society" plan of Prime Minister Jacques Chaban-Delmas, and thus won the trust of Georges Pompidou, elected President in 1969. He quit the government after de Gaulle's resignation and founded the association Présence du gaullisme (Presence of Gaullism).

From the 1970s to the 2000s 

He occupied cabinet positions again in the 1970s, serving first as Minister of state charged of the Overseas Territories in 1971, then as Prime Minister from July 1972 to May 1974.

Messmer's cabinet (July 1972 – May 1974) 

He succeeded in this function to Jacques Chaban-Delmas, who had adopted a parliamentary reading of the Constitution, which Messmer opposed in his investiture speech. Messmer had been chosen by Pompidou as a guarant of his fidelity to de Gaulle, and his cabinet included personalities close to Pompidou, such as Jacques Chirac, named Minister of Agriculture.

Due to President Georges Pompidou's illness, he dealt with the everyday administration of the country and adopted a conservative stance opposed to Chaban-Delmas' previous policies. Henceforth, he stopped the liberalization of the ORTF media governmental organization, naming as its CEO Arthur Conte, a personal friend of Pompidou.

Under his government, the Union des Démocrates pour la République (UDR) presidential majority negotiated with Valéry Giscard d'Estaing's Independent Republicans an electoral alliance, which enabled it to win the 1973 elections despite the left-wing union realized with the 1972 Common Program. Messmer's second cabinet excluded several Gaullists, among whom Michel Debré, while he named several Independent Republicans members, such as Michel Poniatowski, close to Giscard, himself named Minister of Economy and Finances. A Ministry of Information was also re-created and put under the authority of an ultra-conservative, Philippe Malaud. In June 1974, he initiated the construction of 13 nuclear plants in order to confront the "choc pétrolier" (oil crisis).

In 1974, when Pompidou died, those close to Messmer encouraged him to run for president. He accepted at the condition of Chaban-Delmas, Valéry Giscard d'Estaing and Edgar Faure's withdrawals. Faure accepted, as well as Giscard on the condition that Chaban-Delmas also withdrew himself. However, Chaban-Delmas, despite the Canard enchaînés campaign against him, maintained himself, leading Messmer to withdraw his candidacy. Finally, Valéry Giscard d'Estaing, a conservative rival of the Gaullists, was elected. He served as prime minister for another few weeks after Pompidou's death, ending his term after the presidential elections. Jacques Chirac replaced him on 29 May 1974. After the election of Giscard, he never held again ministerial offices, and became one of the historical voices of Gaullism.

Later career and death 

Messmer remained a member of Parliament for the Moselle department until 1988, and served as President of the Lorraine regional assembly from 1968 to 1992. He was mayor of the town of Sarrebourg from 1971 to 1989. Messmer was also president of the Rally for the Republic (RPR) parliamentary group during the first cohabitation (1986–1988), under Jacques Chirac' government. In 1997 he testified as a witness during the trial of Maurice Papon, charged of crimes against humanity committed under the Vichy regime, and declared: "The time has come when the Frenchmen could stop hating themselves and begin to grant pardon to themselves.". Along with some other former Resistants, he demanded Papon's pardon in 2001.

He died in 2007 aged 91, just four days after fellow Prime Minister Raymond Barre. He was the last surviving major French Politician to have been a member of the Free French forces.

Political career 

Governmental functions

Prime Minister: 1972–1974
Minister of State, Minister of Departments and Overseas Territories: 1971–1972
Minister of Armies: 1960–1969

Electoral mandates

National Assembly

Member of the National Assembly of France for Moselle: 1969–1971, 1974–1988

Regional Council

President of the Regional Council of Lorraine: 1978–1979
Regional councillor of Lorraine: 1968–1992

General Council

General councillor of Moselle: 1970–1982

Municipal Council

Mayor of Sarrebourg: 1971–1989
Municipal councillor of Sarrebourg: 1971–1989

Honours 

An important figure of the French Resistance during World War II, Pierre Messmer was a member of the Ordre de la Libération, and the recipient of numerous decorations including the highest rank of the Légion d'honneur. In 2006, he was named Chancellier de l'Ordre de la Libération after the death of General Alain de Boissieu. He was also an officer of the American Legion.

In 1992 he became president of the Institut Charles de Gaulle and, in 1995, of the Fondation Charles de Gaulle.

He also became elected as a member of the Académie française (the French language academy) in 1999, replacing a Gaullist comrade, Maurice Schumann. He was also a member of the French Academy of Moral and Political Sciences since 1988, and, since 1976, of the Académie des sciences d'outre-mer (Academy of Sciences of Overseas Territories). He was named perpetual secretary of the Academy of Moral and Political Sciences in 1995. He was also chancellor of the Institut de France (1998–2005) before becoming honorary chancellor.

In October 2001, Messmer succeeded to the General Jean Simon as President of the Fondation de la France libre (Foundation of Free France).

Messmer's First Ministry, 5 July 1972 – 2 April 1973 
Pierre Messmer – Prime Minister
Maurice Schumann – Minister of Foreign Affairs
Michel Debré – Minister of National Defense
Raymond Marcellin – Minister of the Interior
Valéry Giscard d'Estaing – Minister of Economy and Finance
Jean Charbonnel – Minister of Industrial and Scientific Development
Joseph Fontanet – Minister of National Education, Labour, Employment, and Population
René Pleven – Minister of Justice
André Bord – Minister of Veterans
Jacques Duhamel – Minister of Cultural Affairs
Jacques Chirac – Minister of Agriculture and Rural Development
Olivier Guichard – Minister of Housing, Tourism, Equipment, and Regional Planning
Robert Galley – Minister of Transport
Jean Foyer – Minister of Public Health
Hubert Germain – Minister of Posts and Telecommunications
Yvon Bourges – Minister of Commerce
Roger Frey – Minister of Administrative Reforms
Edgar Faure – Minister of Social Affairs

Changes
15 March 1973 – André Bettencourt succeeds Schumann as interim Minister of Foreign Affairs.
16 March 1973 – Pierre Messmer succeeds Pleven as interim Minister of Justice.

Messmer's Second Ministry, 6 April 1973 – 1 March 1974 
Pierre Messmer – Prime Minister
Michel Jobert – Minister of Foreign Affairs
Robert Galley – Minister of Armies
Raymond Marcellin – Minister of the Interior
Valéry Giscard d'Estaing – Minister of Economy and Finance
Jean Charbonnel – Minister of Industrial and Scientific Development
Georges Gorse – Minister of Labour, Employment, and Population
Jean Taittinger – Minister of Justice
Joseph Fontanet – Minister of National Education
André Bord – Minister of Veterans and War Victims
Maurice Druon – Minister of Cultural Affairs
Jacques Chirac – Minister of Agriculture and Rural Development
Robert Poujade – Minister of Natural Protection and Environment
Bernard Stasi – Minister of Overseas Departments and Territories
Olivier Guichard – Minister of Housing, Tourism, Regional Planning, and Equipment
Yves Guéna – Minister of Transport
Joseph Comiti – Minister of Relations with Parliament
Michel Poniatowski – Minister of Public Health
Hubert Germain – Minister of Posts and Telecommunications
Philippe Malaud – Minister of Information
Jean Royer – Minister of Commerce and Craft Industry
Alain Peyrefitte – Minister of Administrative Reforms

Changes
23 October 1973 – Philippe Malaud becomes Minister of Civil Service. Jean-Philippe Lecat succeeds Malaud as Minister of Information

Messmer's Third Ministry, 1 March – 28 May 1974 
Pierre Messmer – Prime Minister
Michel Jobert – Minister of Foreign Affairs
Robert Galley – Minister of Armies
Jacques Chirac – Minister of the Interior
Valéry Giscard d'Estaing – Minister of Economy and Finance
Yves Guéna – Minister of Industry, Commerce, and Craft Industry
Georges Gorse – Minister of Labour, Employment, and Population
Jean Taittinger – Minister of Justice
Joseph Fontanet – Minister of National Education
Alain Peyrefitte – Minister of Cultural Affairs and Environment
Raymond Marcellin – Minister of Agriculture and Rural Development
Olivier Guichard – Minister of Regional Planning and Equipment
Hubert Germain – Minister of Relations with Parliament
Michel Poniatowski – Minister of Public Health
Jean Royer – Minister of Posts and Telecommunications
Jean-Philippe Lecat – Minister of Information

Changes
11 April 1974 – Hubert Germain succeeds Royer as interim Minister of Posts and Telecommunications.

Bibliography 

 1939  Le Régime administratif des emprunts coloniaux. Thesis for his Doctorate of Laws (Librairie juridique et administrative)
 1977  Le Service militaire. Débat avec Jean-Pierre Chevènement  (Balland)
 1985  Les Écrits militaires du général de Gaulle, in collaboration with Professor Alain Larcan (PUF)
 1992  Après tant de batailles, Mémoires  (Albin Michel)
 1998  Les Blancs s’en vont. Récits de décolonisation  (Albin Michel)
 2002  La Patrouille perdue  (Albin Michel)
 2003  Ma part de France  (Xavier de Guibert)

See also 
Politics of France
France in the 20th century

References

External links 
L'Organisation des Nations Unies et les guerres civiles by Messmer 
Museum of the Order of the Liberation page on Pierre Messmer 

1916 births
2007 deaths
People from Vincennes
Companions of the Liberation
French colonial governors and administrators
French colonial people in Cameroon
French Roman Catholics
French prisoners of war in the 20th century
Politicians of the French Fifth Republic
French Ministers of Defence
French Ministers of Justice
Lycée Louis-le-Grand alumni
École nationale de la France d'Outre-Mer alumni
Members of the Académie Française
Members of the Académie des sciences morales et politiques
Prime Ministers of France
Soldiers of the French Foreign Legion
French Army personnel of World War II
French Army officers
Grand Croix of the Légion d'honneur
Recipients of the Croix de Guerre 1939–1945 (France)
Rally for the Republic politicians
Union of Democrats for the Republic politicians
French Ministers of Overseas France
French colonial governors of Mauritania